Ecstatic dance is a form of dance in which the dancers, sometimes without the need to follow specific steps, abandon themselves to the rhythm and move freely as the music takes them, leading to trance and a feeling of ecstasy. The effects of ecstatic dance begin with ecstasy itself, which may be experienced in differing degrees. Dancers are described as feeling connected to others, and to their own emotions. The dance serves as a form of meditation, helping people to cope with stress and to attain serenity.

In the ancient and widespread practice of shamanism, ecstatic dance and rhythmic drumming are used to alter consciousness in spiritual practices. Ecstatic sacred dances are known also from religious traditions around the world. Modern ecstatic dance was revived by Gabrielle Roth in the 1970s and formalised in her 5Rhythms practice; it is now found in variants across the western world.

Attitudes to ecstatic dance have varied widely. In the 1920s, musicologists such as Paul Nettl and Fritz Böhme considered it primitive and unrefined. More recently, it has been compared to dancing in raves and in club culture, the anthropologist Michael J. Winkelman and the musicologist Rupert Till finding in these forms elements of ritual, spirituality, and healing. The philosopher Gediminas Karoblis relates early ecstatic dance to religious ritual, and notes that all well-executed dance borders on ecstasy.

Ecstasy 

Ecstasy (from Ancient Greek ἔκστασις ékstasis, in turn from ἐκ (ek, out) and ἵστημι (hístēmi, I stand) is a subjective experience of total involvement of the subject, with an object of his or her awareness.  In classical Greek literature it meant the removal of the mind or body "from its normal place of function."

The primary effect of ecstatic dance is ecstasy itself. In particular, sacred dancers actively pursue ecstasy "in the experience of seizure and rapture". The religious historian Mircea Eliade stated that shamans use dance, repetitive music, fasting, and hallucinogenic drugs to induce ecstasy. The ethnologist Maria-Gabriela Wosien identified four degrees of ecstasy that dancers may experience: "the warning, the whisper of inspiration, the prophecy, and finally the gift, the highest grade of inspiration."

The described effects of ecstatic dance include a feeling of connection with others, indeed of "universal relatedness", and with the dancer's own emotions; serving as a meditation, providing a way of coping with stress and restoring serenity; and serving as a spiritual practice. Roth identified specific emotions associated with the five different rhythms of ecstatic dance that she used, namely that the flowing rhythm connected the dancer with their own fear; the staccato rhythm with anger; chaos with sadness; lyrical with joy; and stillness with compassion.

Ancient 

Little is known directly of ecstatic dance in ancient times. However, Greek mythology does have several stories of the Maenads; the maenads were intoxicated female worshippers of the Greek god of wine, Dionysus, known for their "ecstatic revelations and frenzied dancing". The mythical female followers of Dionysus, including bacchants and thyai as well as maenads, were said to have sought the "wild delirium" of possession by the god so they could "get out of themselves", which was called "ekstasis". The male counterparts of the Maenads were the Korybantes, armed and crested ecstatic dancers who worshipped the Phrygian goddess Cybele with drumming and dancing. They were the offspring of the muse Thalia and the god Apollo. The Greeks often confused them with other ecstatic male confraternities, such as the Idaean Dactyls or the Cretan Kouretes, spirit-youths (kouroi) with magical powers who acted as guardians of the infant Zeus.

The myths gave rise to ancient Greek practices in honour of Dionysus. The oreibasia ("mountain dancing") was a midwinter Dionysian rite practised by women, and said to be originally an "unrestrained, ecstatic dance where the 'human' personality was temporarily replaced by another", though it eventually became structured into a definite ritual.

The theologian W. O. E. Oesterley argues that Old Testament passages such as 1 Kings 18:26, "They [The prophets of Baal] limped about the altar they had made", and 1 Kings 18:21, "How long will ye limp upon two legs?" describe a kind of ecstatic dance used for pagan worship in which the knees were bent, one after the other, to give a kind of limping step repeated for each leg. He notes that the dance increased "to an orgiastic frenzy", as by 1 Kings 18:28 the dancers are crying aloud and cutting themselves "with knives and lances". He suggests that this might have been intended to awaken the god's pity and hence answer the people's prayers. Oesterley compares this to Apuleius's account in his 2nd century The Golden Ass 8:27-28 of the ecstatic dance of the priests of the Syrian goddess, in which "they began to howl all out of tune and hurl themselves hither and thither as though they were mad. They made a thousand gest[ure]s with their feet and their heads; they would bend down their necks, and spin round so that their hair flew out at a circle; they would bite their own flesh; finally, everyone took his two-edged weapon and wounded his arms in divers[e] places."

Oesterley notes also that Heliodorus of Emesa recorded in his 3rd century Aethiopica 4:16ff that sailors from Tyre performed a dance worshipping their god Herakles, to the "quick music" of flutes, hopping, jumping up, "limping along on the ground, and then turning with the whole body, spinning around like men possessed."

Traditions 

A variety of religions and other traditions, founded at different times but still practised around the world today, make use of ecstatic dance.

Modern 

Early in the 20th century, the Austrian dancer Grete Wiesenthal turned the formal Viennese Waltz into an ecstatically danced performance with "swirling, euphoric movement and suspended arches of the body", the dancers "with unbound hair and swinging dresses".

Modern ecstatic dance is a style of dance improvisation with little or no formal structure or steps to follow or any particular way to dance. Modern ecstatic dance has developed alongside Western interest in tantra; the two are sometimes combined, and ecstatic dance often plays a part in tantra workshops. Contemporary ecstatic dance events also have overlap with contact improvisation, with dancers often spontaneously claiming floor space for partnered or group weight-sharing dance.

The dancer and musician Gabrielle Roth brought the term "Ecstatic Dance" back into current usage in the 1970s at the Esalen Institute with her dance format called 5Rhythms. This consists of five sections, each accompanied by trance music with a different rhythm, together constituting a "Wave". The five rhythms (in order) are Flowing, Staccato, Chaos, Lyrical and Stillness. The form strongly expects dancers to shape a distinct movement style consistent with each of the five rhythms, which in practice is unlike other contemporary ecstatic dance as these rhythms often look similar between dancers, but has few other rules.  The dance music set is carefully arranged, as documented in Roth's 1989 book Maps to Ecstasy and a set of three DVDs.

Many different formats have developed since the 1970s, often spun off from Roth's 5Rhythms. After being taught by Roth in 1989, Susannah and Ya'Acov Darling-Khan founded the Moving Centre School in Britain in 1989, teaching the 5 rhythms across Europe. In the early 1990s, "Barefoot Boogie" in San Francisco offered twice weekly drug and alcohol free dance event very similar in form to contemporary ecstatic dance, without the name. In 2006, having met shamans in the Amazon, the Darling-Khans started their own ecstatic dance form, Movement Medicine. The science and environment journalist Christine Ottery, writing for the British newspaper The Guardian in 2011, suggested that "ecstatic dancing has an image problem", but that it "encompasses everything from large global movements such as 5Rhythms and Biodanza to local drum'n'dance meet-ups". Reviewing her experience of 5Rhythms for the newspaper, she suggests that readers may "find 5 Rhythms a good place to start" if wanting to try ecstatic dance.

However, there are other styles that have been developed in North America, too, including the Ecstatic Dance Community founded in 2001 by Max Fathom at Kalani Honua in Puna on the Big Island of Hawaii and influenced by Carol Marashi's 1994 Body Choir in Austin, Texas. Also in Texas, Sydney 'Samadhi' Strahan founded Ecstatic Dance Evolution in Houston in 2003, whilst the Tribal Dance Community of Julia Ray opened in Toronto in 2006. A more influential event program of ecstatic dance, simply named Ecstatic Dance, was founded later, in 2008, by Tyler Blank and Donna Carroll and held at Sweet's Ballroom in Oakland, California. By 2018, the Ecstatic Dance Community Foundation listed over 80 places which offered "organized, spontaneous dance practices". Participants at contemporary ecstatic dance events are paid entry events, and usually share an agreement of no drugs or alcohol, no shoes or talking on the dance floor, and respect for consent in partnering in touch, including a hand on heart or crossed arms signal when the dancer is not wanting a partner. Many ecstatic dance events start and end with a sharing circle, and some have altars and journals for expressive writing, and in Portland Oregon even have an "epiphany bell" dancers can ring at a particularly elevated moment, which is usually met by cheers.

Reception

20th century attitudes

The musicologist , writing in 1929, granted that ecstatic dance had emotional power "expressive of some psychic exaltation, some intensified emotion", and that the "ordered rhythm" on which it was based was hypnotic, inducing a meditative state and the "dissolution of consciousness", but argued that it was a "primitive" form of dance, a precursor to "higher", more structured dance forms. Nettl stated further that ecstatic dance was both religious and erotic, giving examples from ancient Greece, medieval Christianity and Sufism.
In his 1926 Tanzkunst ("Art of Dance"), the dance theorist Fritz Böhme similarly asserted, without giving examples to illustrate the statement, that ecstatic dance lacked "artistic refinement", being limited to "a natural, organically grown expression."

Philosophy

The philosopher Gediminas Karoblis states that in early cultures, ecstatic dance was linked to religious ritual, releasing the dancer from the egocentric self, undoing self-consciousness and connecting to the absolute. In Karoblis's view, trance dances can be either ecstatic or magical. He considers that the trance of the whirling dervishes is genuinely ecstatic as it glorifies God, whereas shamanistic dance is not, being instead magical, as it is intended to induce effects in the world. Karoblis notes that all dance borders on ecstasy, as the catharsis that it produces – if good – cannot be controlled or "technically calculated", yet dancers depend upon it.

Psychology

The psychoanalyst Mary Jo Spencer used the image of the ecstatic dancer (a Maenad) depicted in the Villa of Mysteries, Pompeii when explaining the appearance of the dance as a symbol for the psyche. She described in the fresco "a nude woman with a flowing scarf turning in a contained but ecstatic dance, much like the description of the dervishes: she does not dance in ecstasy; she is the dance". This was in the context of a client who presented a continuing "motif" of dance, which appeared whenever "a major shift in attitude" was imminent.

Mindfulness

The nursing researcher Yaowarat Matchim and colleagues write that while mindfulness meditation arose in Buddhism, practices that provoke mindfulness are found in wisdom traditions around the world; such practices include ecstatic dance as well as yoga, prayer, music, and art.

Parallels

The anthropologist Michael J. Winkelman suggests that shamanism and modern raves share structures including social ritual and the use of dance and music for bonding, for communication of emotions, and for their effects on consciousness and personal healing.

The musicologist Rupert Till places contemporary club dancing to electronic dance music within the framework of ecstatic dance. He writes that "club culture has elements of religion, spirituality and meaning. Its transgressional nature is partly a reaction to the history of repression of traditions of ecstatic dancing by Christianity, particularly by Puritan and Lutheran traditions." He notes that the scholars of music Nicholas Saunders and Simon Reynolds both discuss electronic dance music culture "in terms of trance rituals and ecstatic states."

Documentation

In their 2003 documentary Dances of Ecstasy, the filmmakers Michelle Mahrer and Nicole Ma portrayed ecstatic dances from around the world, with traditional dances by the San of the Kalahari desert of Namibia, and by the Yoruba of Nigeria; the modern annual Firedance celebration in the Santa Cruz Mountains, California; by Gabrielle Roth; the whirling Zikr dance of the Sufi dervishes; the Hadra ritual danced by Moroccan women, brought by immigrants from Ghana and Senegal; the modern Rainbow Serpent Festival in Australia; the Candomblé ritual in Brazil, derived from Yoruba, Fon of Benin, and Congolese traditions; and the shamanistic Kut ritual of Korea.

See also 
 Authentic Movement
 Sacred dance

References

External links
 Archived Kalani.com Blog
 Leave Your Shoes at the Door – A Conscious Dance Documentary
 Dances of Ecstasy, a 2003 documentary about ecstatic dance forms around the world

Free and improvised dance